Aleksander Kogan (born 15 April 1980, in Dushanbe, Tajik Soviet Socialist Republic) is а Russian singer, songwriter and film actor. Winner of the Golden Gramophone (2013 2014), RU.TV (2015) and Song of the Year (2013, 2014, 2015) Awards.

Early life 
Alexander Kogan was born оп 15 April 1980, in Dushanbe, Tajikistan. When he was 6, his family moved to Moscow. In 1990, his father, Valery Kogan, was dispatched to work at the UN headquarters in New York. The family left for the United States to return later.

From 1995 to 1998, Alexander attended Woodside Priory School in California. He later attended George Mason University in Virginia, where he graduated with а degree in Political Science. Не plays piano and guitar.

First steps 
Alexander Kogan has been passionate about music since childhood. The songs of Frank Sinatra, Nat King Cole, Louis Armstrong and Chris Isaak could be heard from his room. His family and close friends could often watch home performances.
At the age of ten, Alexander visited а large-scale music show for the first time. The show was held at the Olympic Stadium in Moscow, where Kogan went together with his elder sister, who worked as а journalist for а fashion magazine at that time. The future performer had а chance not опlу to see the show from the viewing stand, but also to attend the sound check session backstage and even to chat with the musicians. That day and that powerful experience of feeling the energy of the live music and the full house, hearing the storm of applause and seeing the performers' emotions on stage became а landmark in his life.

Alexander wrote his first song at the age of 14. And when studying at the University in Washington, he founded his first music band. Не was only 18, looking for his own style and his own sound, composing songs. Within several years, music turned into the most important part of his life. During his university years, he toured the US, always striving for perfection, discovering something new in his work. 
Despite his strong passion for music, Alexander graduated from George Mason University successfully and got а degree in Political Science.

Music career 
Kogan took interest in playing the piano at the age of 7. At the age of 14, he created his first rough solo piano pieces. At 18, he established his first music band. Не was studying and creating at the same time, playing in musical bands while going for а degree, performing at student parties. Не went on tour around the United States. Some of his songs in English, such as "Baby You're an Astronaut", "Leaving Tomorrow Behind" and "I Will", were really popular. 
Upon graduation, he returned to Moscow. In 2001, he began to work with Alla Pugacheva. Under the name of Christian Ako, he released four tracks: "The Girl of My Dreams", "This Can't Be Happening", "Executioner Love" and "Open to All the Winds". 
From 2004 to 2010, he was performing solo and had а chance to work with American producers Walter Afanasieff and David Foster, as well as to arrange а solo music show in New York.

In 2011, he began to collaborate with а Russian songwriter and producer Victor Drobysh. This teamwork resulted 'п the single "Who Invented the World". With this song, Kogan won his first Golden Gramophone Award. This was followed By the songs "Who Was the One to Break Up" and "I'm Waiting for а Call" (feat. Mikhail Gutseriev).

After the watershed encounter with Julio Iglesias, music evolved from а favorite hobby to the beloved profession. Kogan devoted much effort to musical material, which included recording songs both in English and Russian. Не started collaborating with the famous American producers, David Foster and Walter Afanasieff, and gave а solo concert in New York.
 
In 2012, Alexander began to work with а well-known Russian songwriter and producer Victor Drobysh. Radio stations and music TV channels started broadcasting the song "Who Invented the World" that instantly made it to the top of the charts. Alexander was invited to perform as а guest of honor at tl1e Slavic Bazaar festival in Vitebsk and at the international competition of young singers New Wave 2013 in Jurmala. In winter 2013, Alexander Kogan took part in the Song of the Year show and won the Golden Gramophone Award with his song "Who Invented the World". 
The singer's artistic background now also includes а stellar duet with Valeria.

In the spring of 2014, with his video "Who Invented the World'', Alexander was nominated for the Russian Music Award of RU.TV channel in tl1e Getting High category. 
At the same time, Kogan's new song "Who Was the One to Break Up" went on air and climbed to the top of the charts immediately. In May, а video with the same name was presented to the public and became one of the most anticipated video premieres of the spring.

In July 2014, Alexander performed at the Slavic Bazaar festival and the New Wave international competition once again. The audience appreciated the vibrant, artistic performances of the singer they already knew quite well. 
In the autumn of the same year, а new hit song "I'm Waiting for а Call" went on air оп Russian radio stations and music ТУ channels. And in November 2014, Alexander received his second Golden Gramophone Award for the song 'Who Was the One to Break Up".

In March 2015, there was а milestone event in the performer's career - Alexander presented the long-awaited debut album I'm Waiting for а Call to the Russian audience. The album includes 14 powerful, vibrant, lyrical, vigorous and touching songs. It took the singer almost two years to release this album, highly appreciated By both music critics and listeners. 
In May 2015, with his video "I'm Waiting for а Call", Alexander Kogan won the Dolce Vita award at the 5th Russian Music Award festival organized By RU.TV Channel.

In March 2015, he released his debut solo album I'm Waiting for а Call. In November 2015, Alexander went оп his first tour of central Russia.

In September 2016, Kogan presented а video for the song "Happiness". 
"Music and songwriting must be sincere. I've always tried to ensure that my songs bring joy and make people feel good. Thank you for your support and inspiration!" Alexander Kogan said.

А Twist of Fate. The Encounter that Changed It All 
The passion for music could have remained а passion of youth, but fate had other plans. Alexander Kogan had an encounter that changed everything. At one of the concerts, the young man was noticed By Julio lglesias. Alexander was singing the song "Smile", once performed By Charlie Chaplin. Julio Iglesias appreciated Alexander's performance and took an interest in his personality. That was the first day of the artistic friendship between the young singer and maestro lglesias.

It was Julio Iglesias who contributed to Alexander's final decision to turn music into а profession. Не helped Alexander to establish his own style and manner of performance. Alexander proved to be а very capable and gifted student.

When Julio Iglesias was going to visit Russia and Ukraine with а tour, he invited Alexander Kogan to open his concerts. They performed together in Moscow, St. Petersburg, Rostov-onDon, Dnepropetrovsk and other cities. Maestro was so deeply impressed By Alexander's performances and creative work that after the Russian tour he offered him to keep working together during the world tour. Kogan has been the only performer to be honored like that. Julio lglesias and Alexander Kogan have already toured many countries and cities, and many are still ahead.

"Friendship and collaboration with Julio lglesias have contributed а lot to my formation. I treat our every encounter as а chance to learn something from him. Не is а legend, а most gifted singer and а great performer. I keep thanking the maestro for contributing so much to my artistic life," Alexander Kogan says.

Albums 
2015 - l'm Wailing for а Call.

Track listing 
Album: l'm Waiting for а Call 
 "Radio" 
 "Who Invented the World" 
 "I'm Waiting for а Call" 
 "I Love You the Way I Want То"
 "Who Was the One to Break Up" 
 "Moscow Girl" 
 "But for You" 
 "Don't Say" 
 "I Don't Believe You" 
 "Reflection" 
 "You're Dancing" 
 "You're Far Away" 
 "The Feast of Love" 
 "Who Was the One to Break Up" RМХ

Awards 
2013: 
Golden Gramophone Award for the song "Who Invented the World".

2014: 
Golden Gramophone Award for the song "Who Was the One to Break Up".

2015: 
RU.TV Award (Dolce Vita category).

Videos

Acting career 
In 2013, Alexander Kogan made а small appearance as а Russian singer in the movie Safe by the Hollywood film director Boaz Yakin, with Jason Statham starring.

References

External links 
 Official web-site
 Youtube Channel

Living people
Russian musicians
1980 births
George Mason University alumni